Brooklyn Hills is a former Long Island Rail Road station, located at Myrtle Avenue in Forest Park, Queens, New York City, near Glendale, Queens. Opened in 1882, the station was part of the now-defunct Rockaway Beach Branch to the Rockaway Peninsula; during most of its time in operation, trains to the station originated from the Montauk Branch. The station was closed in 1911, replaced with the nearby Brooklyn Manor station at Jamaica Avenue. The entire line ceased operations on June 8, 1962.

History
Opened in 1882 by the New York, Woodhaven and Rockaway Railroad (former operators of the branch), Brooklyn Hills was one of the oldest stations on the line. Until 1910, it was the northernmost station on the Rockaway Beach Branch. Trains continued north and west along the Montauk Branch towards Long Island City, connecting with a ferry to Manhattan. On June 16, 1910, the electrified Glendale Cut-off extended the line north from the Glendale Junction with the Montauk Division to Whitepot Junction at Rego Park on the Main Line; Rockaway Beach trains could now run via the Main Line to Penn Station in Manhattan. The year before, it was proposed to relocate the station 3,000 feet to the south at Jamaica Avenue, due to the present station's location in the sparsely-populated Forest Park area. Brooklyn Hills was demolished on January 9, 1911 and replaced by the larger Brooklyn Manor station. Brooklyn Hills station was the first station on the line to close.

References

External links
Former Rockaway Beach Branch, including Rego Park Station (Forgotten New York)
LIRR History (TrainsAreFun.com)
Brooklyn Hills and Brooklyn Manor Stations (Arrt's Arrchives)

Former Long Island Rail Road stations in New York City
Railway stations in Queens, New York
Railway stations in the United States opened in 1882
1882 establishments in New York (state)
Railway stations closed in 1911
1911 disestablishments in New York (state)